Parmentier can refer to:

People 
André Parmentier (landscape architect) (1780–1830), American landscape architect
André Parmentier (sport shooter) (1876-1969), French Olympic sport shooter
Antoine-Augustin Parmentier (1737–1813), French scientist and promoter of the use of potatoes as a food source at the end of the 18th century
Armand Parmentier (born 1954), former Olympic long-distance runner from Belgium
Henri Parmentier, French archeologist
Jean Parmentier (diplomat) (1883–1936)
Jean Parmentier (explorer) (1494–1529), French navigator, cartographer, and poet
Julie-Marie Parmentier (born  1981), French actress
Koene Dirk Parmentier, KLM airplane pilot in the 1948 KLM Constellation air disaster
Marc Parmentier (born 1956), Belgian scientist
Pauline Parmentier (born 1986), French tennis player
Philippe Parmentier (1787–1867), Belgian sculptor

Other uses 
Parmentier (Paris Metro), station on the Paris Metro
 Parmentier (band), a short-lived music band in New Zealand
 Hachis Parmentier, a French dish based on mashed potato
 Parmentier (Dune), a fictional planet from the  Dune universe

French-language surnames